James Hamilton, Lord Paisley (died before 1670) was the eldest son of James Hamilton, 2nd Earl of Abercorn and Katherine Clifton, 2nd Baroness Clifton. Born a Catholic he became a Presbyterian before 1646. He predeceased his father and is therefore an example of an heir apparent who never succeeded.

Birth and origins 
James was born in the early 1630s, probably in Paisley, Scotland, the eldest son of James Hamilton and his wife Katherine Clifton. His father was the 2nd Earl of Abercorn. His mother was Dowager Duchess of Lennox from her previous marriage and Baroness Clifton of Leighton Bromswold, England, in her own right. His parents had married in 1632 or not much before as she on 28 November 1632 obtained permission from the king to keep her precedence as a dowager duchess despite now marrying an earl. He had two brothers, who are listed in his father's article.

Both his parents were Catholics and therefore recusants in Scotland. His mother died in Scotland while he was still an infant. As she was a Catholic, the Church of Scotland refused her a burial ceremony. As heir apparent of the Earl of Abercorn, James was styled Lord Paisley, which was at that time the courtesy title for the heir apparent in the family according to the Scottish manner. The rank of this title is a Lord of Parliament and is equivalent to an English or Irish baron. By 1646 Lord Paisley had become a good Presbyterian as is asserted in the proceedings of the General Assembly of the kirk of that year.

Marriage and children 
On 28 April 1653, at St Bartholomew-the-Less in London, Lord Paisley married Catherine Lenthall, niece of William Lenthall, speaker of the Long Parliament. His wife was a Protestant, the church where they married was Anglican.

 
James and Catherine had one daughter:
 Catherine Hamilton (1653–1723), who married first William Lenthall of Burford, grandson of the Speaker (died 1686), and secondly her second cousin (see family tree) Charles Hamilton, 5th Earl of Abercorn.

Their daughter married Charles Hamilton, a second cousin (see Family tree), who had also become a Protestant.

Restoration 
At the Restoration Lord Paisley tried to obtain some preferment through the intermediate of his uncle Sir George Hamilton, 1st Baronet (see Family tree), who was now well connected at the court as he had been in exile with the King. This is shown in a letter preserved in the Bodleian Library.

Death, succession, and timeline 
Lord Paisley died before his father and had no son. The next brother, William, also predeceased his father, so that the youngest brother, George, succeeded as heir apparent and inherited the corresponding courtesy title. George succeeded as the 3rd Earl of Abercorn at the father's death in 1670.

Notes and references

Notes

Citations

Sources 

  – Ab-Adam to Basing (for Abercorn)
  – Canonteign to Cutts (for Clifton)
 
  – Abercorn to Balmerino (for Abercorn)

1630s births
1660s deaths
British courtesy barons and lords of Parliament
Heirs apparent who never acceded
Younger sons of barons